Malia Leilani Pyles (born July 13, 2000) is an American actress. She is best known for her portrayals of Sarah Baskets on FX's Baskets and Minnie "Mouse" Honrada in HBO Max's Pretty Little Liars: Original Sin.

Early life and education 
Malia Leilani Pyles was born on July 13, 2000 in Huntington Beach, California as the only child to Richard Pyles, who is of English descent, and Cora C. Pyles, who is originally from the Philippines.

Pyles began modeling at age eight. After appearing in Susan's Remembrance in 2011, Malia joined Hollywood-based Young Actor’s Studio, where she studied with coaches Carol Goldwasser and Lisa Picotte. At age fourteen, she began attending Orange County School of the Arts. She attended other acting institutes such Bradley Baker, Broadway on Tour, Hollywood Kids, The Actor’s Circle, and OC Crazies.

Career

2011–2021: Career beginnings, Baskets, and Batwoman 
Pyles began her acting career in 2011 in the short film Susan's Remembrance. She continued on to play roles in the short films The Lepidoctor (2012), No Child Left Deprived (2013), and Guests (2014). In 2014, she made her television debut, portraying the role of Kristen in the short-lived series Scarlett. In 2015, she appeared in films such as The Heyday of the Insensitive Bastards and Memoria.

In 2016, Pyles appeared as Amanda Jane in an episode of Nickelodeon's Bella and the Bulldogs. In the same year, Pyles landed her first recurring role as Sarah Baskets in the FX comedy series Baskets. In 2017, she continued to play roles in the television series Speechless, The Fosters, How to Get Away with Murder.

In 2020, Pyles appeared as Parker Torres in Batwoman. In 2021, she appeared in the short films The Soot Man and Conjugal Revivification.

2022–present: Pretty Little Liars: Original Sin 
In 2022, Pyles gained international recognition when she began portraying Minnie "Mouse" Honrada, a 15-year-old high school student, in HBO Max's critically acclaimed drama series Pretty Little Liars: Original Sin. In September 2022, the series was renewed for a second season. In October of the same year, the new season was teased under the title Pretty Little Liars: Summer School.

Personal life 
Pyles currently resides in California and openly identifies as queer. 

On October 24, 2022, Pyles officially announced her relationship with Pretty Little Liars: Original Sin co-star Jordan Gonzalez after they appeared in a Halloween photoshoot together.

Filmography

Film

Television

References

External links 

 

Living people
2000 births
American people of Filipino descent
21st-century American actresses
American film actresses
American television actresses

Actresses from California
American queer actresses
LGBT actresses
LGBT people from California
Queer actresses
Queer women